Ella Mikhaylovna Polyakova (born 7 February 1941) is a Russian human rights activist, a member of President Vladimir Putin's advisory council on human rights. She is also a leader of non-governmental organization Soldiers' Mothers of St. Petersburg.

Opinions on Ukrainian crisis 
At a situation, when Kremlin consistently denies involvement in the conflict in Ukraine, Polyakova openly talked about dead and wounded Russian soldiers and also called the Russian intrusion an "invasion". "When masses of people, under commanders' orders, on tanks, APCs and with the use of heavy weapons, (are) on the territory of another country, cross the border, I consider this an invasion," Ella Polyakova said on 29 August 2014.

She has also said more than 100 Russian soldiers were killed in eastern Ukraine in a single battle in August 2014 while helping pro-Russian separatists fight Ukrainian troops. According to her, around 300 people were also wounded in the same incident near the town of Snizhnye, when a column of trucks they were driving, full of ammunition, was hit by a sustained volley of Grad missiles.

Awards 
 Galina Starovoitova Peace Prize (1999)
  (2004)
  (2010)

References

External links 
 Russian NGO branded as 'foreign agent' after reporting on Russian military action in Ukraine, Amnesty.org, 29. 8. 2014
 Soldiers' Mothers of St. Petersburg web site.

Russian human rights activists
Living people
1941 births
Women human rights activists